Marcus A. Coolidge (1865–1947) was a U.S. Senator from Massachusetts from 1931 to 1937. Senator Coolidge may also refer to:

Arthur W. Coolidge (1881–1952), Massachusetts State Senate
Calvin Coolidge (1872–1933), Massachusetts State Senate
Carlos Coolidge (1792–1866), Vermont State Senate
Horace H. Coolidge (1832–1912), Massachusetts State Senate
John Calvin Coolidge Sr. (1845–1926), Vermont State Senate